The Dapitan City Council is Dapitan's Sangguniang Panlungsod or legislative body. The council has 13 members which are composed of ten councilors, one ex officio member elected from the ranks of barangay (neighborhood) chairmen, one ex officio member elected from the ranks of Sangguniang Kabataan (youth council) chairmen and one presiding officer. The Vice-mayor of the city is the presiding officer of the council, who is elected citywide.

The council is responsible for creating laws and ordinances under the city's jurisdiction. The mayor can veto proposed bills, but the council can override it with a two-thirds supermajority.

The council meets at the SP Session Hall inside Dapitan Government Center for their regular sessions.

Powers, duties and functions
The Sangguniang Panlungsod, as the legislative body of the city, is mandated by the Local Government Code of 1991 to:

Enact ordinances;
Approve resolutions;
Appropriate funds for the general welfare of the city and its inhabitants; and
Ensure the proper exercise of the corporate powers of the city as provided for under Section 22 of the Local Government Code.

Furthermore, the following duties and functions are relegated to the Sangguniang Panlungsod:

Approve ordinances and pass resolutions necessary for an efficient and effective city government;
Generate and maximize the use of resources and revenues for the development plans, program objectives and priorities of the city as provided for under section 18 of the Local Government Code of 1991, with particular attention to agro-industrial development and citywide growth and progress;
Enact ordinances granting franchises and authorizing the issuance of permits or licenses, upon such conditions and for such purposes intended to promote the general welfare of the inhabitants of the city but subject to the provisions of Book II of the Local Government Code of 1991;
Regulate activities relative to the use of land, buildings, and structures within the city in order to promote the general welfare of its inhabitants;
Approve ordinances which shall ensure the efficient and effective delivery of the basic services and facilities as provided for under Section 17 of the Local Government Code; and
Exercise such other powers and perform such other duties and functions as may be prescribed by law or ordinance.

Membership
Each of Dapitan's councilor elects ten members of the council. In plurality-at-large voting, a voter may vote for up to ten candidates and the candidates with the ten highest numbers of votes are elected. Barangay and SK chairs throughout the city each elect a representative to the council, for a total of 12 councilors. City-council elections are synchronized with other elections in the country, which have been held on the second Monday of May every third year since 1992.

2019-2022 membership
These are the members after the 2022 local elections and 2018 barangay and SK elections:

Officers

Former councils

References and notes

References

Notes

See also
Dapitan
2019 Zamboanga del Norte local elections

Dapitan
Politics of Zamboanga del Norte
City councils in the Philippines